The 2015–16 Texas A&M Aggies women's basketball team will represent Texas A&M University in the 2015–16 college basketball season. The team's head coach was Gary Blair, who was in his thirteenth season at Texas A&M. The team plays their home games at the Reed Arena in College Station, Texas and will play in its fourth season as a member of the Southeastern Conference. They finished the season 22–10, 11–5 in SEC play to finish in a tie for second place. They lost in the quarterfinals of the SEC women's tournament to Tennessee. They received an at-large bid to the NCAA women's tournament where defeated Missouri State in the first round before losing to Florida State in the second round.

Roster

Rankings

Schedule and Results

|-
!colspan=12 style="background:#500000; color:#FFFFFF;"| Exhibition

|-
!colspan=12 style="background:#500000; color:#FFFFFF;"| Non-conference games

|-
!colspan=12 style="background:#500000; color:#FFFFFF;"| Conference Games

|-
!colspan=12 style="background:#500000;"| SEC Women's Tournament

|-
!colspan=12 style="background:#500000;"| NCAA Women's Tournament

See also
 2015–16 NCAA Division I women's basketball rankings
 2015–16 Texas A&M Aggies men's basketball team

References

Texas A&M Aggies women's basketball seasons
Texas AandM
Texas AandM Aggies women's basketball
Texas AandM Aggies women's basketball
Texas AandM